Curtner may refer to:

Curtner, Fremont, California, a neighborhood of Fremont in Alameda County, California
Curtner (VTA), a light rail station in San Jose, California

People with the surname
Jack Curtner (1888–1961), American racing driver